Carmenta verecunda is a moth of the family Sesiidae. It was described by Henry Edwards in 1881, and is known from the United States, including Colorado, Utah, California and Arizona.

The larvae feed on Lithospermum ruderale.

References

External links
"640163.00 – 2615 – Carmenta verecunda – (Edwards, 1881)". Moth Photographers Group. Mississippi State University.

Sesiidae
Moths described in 1881